Waleed Bakhit Hamed Adam (born 11 November 1998), also known as Waleed Al-Shoala, is a Sudanese professional footballer who plays as a forward for Sudanese club Al-Hilal Omdurman and the Sudan national team.

Career statistics

International

References

1998 births
Living people
Sudanese footballers
Association football forwards
Al-Hilal Club (Omdurman) players
2022 African Nations Championship players
Sudan A' international footballers
Sudan international footballers
People from Omdurman